Bishop Brennan may refer to:

 Bishop Leonard Brennan, a fictional character in the TV series Father Ted; see List of Father Ted characters (Bishop Brennan)
 "Kicking Bishop Brennan Up the Arse", an episode of the TV series Father Ted
 Denis Brennan (born 1945), Irish Roman Catholic Bishop of Ferns since 2006
 Joseph Vincent Brennan (born 1954), American Roman Catholic Bishop of Fresno since 2019
 Mark E. Brennan (born 1947), American Roman Catholic Bishop of Wheeling-Charleston since 2019
 Robert J. Brennan (born 1962), American Roman Catholic Bishop of Brooklyn since 2021 
 Thomas Francis Brennan, appointed (Roman Catholic) Bishop of Dallas in 1891 and later Auxiliary Bishop of St. John's, Newfoundland